The Ministry of Industry, Science, Technology and Innovation is a government ministry responsible for  industrial, science, technology, innovation policies in Cambodia. Its name was changed from the Ministry of Industry and Handicrafts in March 2020, in response to the fourth Industrial Revolution. The current minister is Cham Prasidh.

References 

Cambodia
Government ministries of Cambodia
Economy of Cambodia
Phnom Penh